The 2011 Petra Kvitová tennis season officially began at the 2011 Brisbane International, the first of two simultaneous events which opened the official 2011 season.

Yearly summary

Australian Open series
Kvitová began her season at the 2011 Brisbane International, as an unseeded player. She upset third seed Nadia Petrova in the first round, then followed it up with wins over Ksenia Pervak, Dominika Cibulková and Anastasia Pavlyuchenkova to reach her first final since 2009, where she faced Andrea Petkovic of Germany. Kvitová won in straight sets to win only her second career title and first in almost two years.

As a result of reaching the final in Brisbane, Kvitová had to withdraw from the qualifying draw for the Medibank International Sydney.

Kvitová's next tournament was the 2011 Australian Open, where she was the 25th seed. She defeated Sally Peers, Anna Chakvetadze, fifth seed Samantha Stosur and Flavia Pennetta, the latter in three sets, to reach the quarter-finals of the Australian Open for the first time. There, she lost to World No. 2 Vera Zvonareva in straight sets. Following the run in Australia, Kvitová entered the world's top 20 for the first time.

Fed Cup quarter-finals
Following the Australian Open, Kvitová was named in the Czech Republic Fed Cup team for its quarter-final against Slovakia. Kvitová won both of her rubbers against Dominika Cibulková and Daniela Hantuchová; her victory over the latter ensured the Czech Republic would progress through to the semi-finals.

Indoor/Middle East series
Following the Fed Cup quarter-finals, Kvitová participated at the 2011 Open GDF Suez, where she was seeded fourth. After surviving three-setters against fellow Czech Barbora Záhlavová-Strýcová and Yanina Wickmayer in earlier rounds, she reached the final, upsetting soon-to-be World No. 1 Kim Clijsters in straight sets to win her second title for the year.

Kvitová then made an early exit from her next tournament, losing in the first round of the 2011 Dubai Tennis Championships to Ayumi Morita of Japan.

American hard court season
The next stop for Kvitová following the Middle East swing was the Premier Mandatory Indian Wells tournament in March. After receiving a bye in the opening round, Kvitová was upset by fellow Czech Barbora Záhlavová-Strýcová, whom she had beaten in Paris the previous month, in the second round.

Kvitová then received a wildcard into the Bahamas Women's Open, but she was upset in the first round by Kristina Barrois in three sets, marking a third consecutive defeat.

The Sony Ericsson Open saw somewhat of a brief return to form for Kvitová; after receiving a first round bye, she defeated Varvara Lepchenko for her first match victory in almost six weeks, but was then upset in three sets by Anastasia Pavlyuchenkova in the third round.

Fed Cup semi-finals

Following her disappointing North American hard court season, Kvitová next represented the Czech Republic in its semi-final against Belgium. Kvitová won both of her singles rubbers against Kirsten Flipkens and Yanina Wickmayer, as the Czechs progressed to the final.

Clay court season
Kvitová kicked off her clay court season at the Mutua Madrid Open, where she was seeded 16th. After defeating Alexandra Dulgheru and Chanelle Scheepers in the first two rounds, she defeated second seed Vera Zvonareva in straight sets in the Round of 16 to progress to the quarter-finals. She then went on to defeat Dominika Cibulková (who had upset Maria Sharapova and Svetlana Kuznetsova in earlier rounds) and Li Na to reach her third final for the year, where she would meet Victoria Azarenka. In the final, Kvitová survived a first set tiebreak and went on to win in straight sets, claiming her first career Tier I/Premier Mandatory title in the process. By winning this title, Kvitová entered the Top 10 for the first time in her career.

Rather than participate in Rome, Kvitová decided to travel home to participate at her home ITF event, the Sparta Prague Open. Seeded first, Kvitová reached her fourth final of the year, but would end up losing to Slovak Magdaléna Rybáriková. During the tournament, she suffered a hip injury, which would force her to withdraw from the Brussels Open the following week.

Kvitová's next tournament was the 2011 French Open, where she was seeded ninth. She defeated Gréta Arn, Zheng Jie and Vania King to reach the fourth round, where she was defeated by the eventual champion, Li Na, in three sets, having led by a break in the final set.

Grass court season

Following a modest clay court campaign, Kvitová made the transition to grass by participating in the AEGON International event in Eastbourne. She defeated Anastasija Sevastova, Ekaterina Makarova, Agnieszka Radwańska and Daniela Hantuchová (the latter retiring) to reach the final, but found Marion Bartoli too good for her in the championship match, losing in three sets.

Wimbledon was next for Kvitová, where she had reached the semi-finals in 2010. Intent on going one better, Kvitová won her first four matches without conceding more than three games in a single set, before surviving three-set thrillers against Tsvetana Pironkova and Victoria Azarenka, to reach her first Grand Slam final. There, she met Maria Sharapova, who was seen as a favourite to win her second title after previously triumphing in 2004. However, Kvitová would win in straight sets to win her first Grand Slam title at the expense of the Russian.

US Open series
Kvitová's form dropped off following her successful grass court campaign. She suffered a pair of losses to Andrea Petkovic in Toronto and Cincinnati (both in the third round and both after receiving a first round bye), then became the first reigning Wimbledon champion to lose in the first round of the US Open when she lost her first match to Alexandra Dulgheru. She finished the US Open series with a paltry 2–3 win-loss record from five matches.

Asian hard court season
Following her unsuccessful US Open series campaign, Kvitová rebounded at the Toray Pan Pacific Open in Tokyo, defeating Mandy Minella, Vania King and Maria Sharapova (retired) before losing to Vera Zvonareva in the semi-finals.

Kvitová then received a first round bye at the China Open, but was defeated in her first match by Sofia Arvidsson of Sweden. That would be the last time that Kvitová was beaten in 2011.

Indoor hard court season
Following the Asian hard court swing, Kvitová received a wildcard into the Generali Ladies Linz, thus making her the top seed. With the exception of her semi-final victory over Jelena Janković, Kvitová won all of her matches in straight sets, including in the final, where she defeated Dominika Cibulková to win her fifth title of the year.

WTA Tour Championships
As a result of Kvitová's excellent results this year, she qualified for the 2011 WTA Tour Championships for the first time in her career. She drew Vera Zvonareva, Caroline Wozniacki and Agnieszka Radwańska in her group in the round robin stage. She went through this stage without dropping a set, thus qualifying for the semi-finals. She then defeated Samantha Stosur in three sets to advance to the final, where she would meet Victoria Azarenka for the third time in the year. Kvitová would win in three sets, to claim her sixth title of the year, go through the entire championships undefeated and become the first woman since Maria Sharapova in 2004 to win the title on her first attempt.

Fed Cup final
To round out the season, Kvitová took part in the Czech Republic's Fed Cup championship match against Russia. She won both of her singles rubbers, against Maria Kirilenko and Svetlana Kuznetsova, as the Czechs claimed their sixth Fed Cup title. Her two singles rubbers saw her finish 2011 on a twelve-match winning streak, which she would unofficially extend to eighteen in the early part of 2012.

All matches

Singles matches

Tournament schedule

Singles schedule

Yearly Records

Head-to-head match-ups

Ordered by percentage, number of victories to number of losses, then in alphabetical order

  Dominika Cibulková 4–0
  Victoria Azarenka 3–0
  Daniela Hantuchová 3–0
  Yanina Wickmayer 3–0
  Anne Keothavong 2–0
  Vania King 2–0
  Agnieszka Radwańska 2–0
  Chanelle Scheepers 2–0
  Maria Sharapova 2–0
  Samantha Stosur 2–0
  Vera Zvonareva 2–2
  Alexandra Dulgheru 1–1
  Li Na 1–1
  Anastasia Pavlyuchenkova 1–1
  Barbora Záhlavová-Strýcová 1–1
  Gréta Arn 1–0
  Elena Baltacha 1–0
  Anna Chakvetadze 1–0
  Kim Clijsters 1–0
  Kirsten Flipkens 1–0
  Alexa Glatch 1–0
  Jelena Janković 1–0
  Zheng Jie 1–0
  Mathilde Johansson 1–0
  Maria Kirilenko 1–0
  Aleksandra Krunić 1–0
  Svetlana Kuznetsova 1–0
  Varvara Lepchenko 1–0
  Ekaterina Makarova 1–0
  Vesna Manasieva 1–0
  Rebecca Marino 1–0
  Bethanie Mattek-Sands 1–0
  Patricia Mayr-Achleitner 1–0
  Anabel Medina Garrigues 1–0
  Mandy Minella 1–0
  Sally Peers 1–0
  Flavia Pennetta 1–0
  Ksenia Pervak 1–0
  Nadia Petrova 1–0
  Anastasija Sevastova 1–0
  Tsvetana Pironkova 1–0
  Roberta Vinci 1–0
  Caroline Wozniacki 1–0
  Andrea Petkovic 1–2
  Sofia Arvidsson 0–1
  Kristina Barrois 0–1
  Marion Bartoli 0–1
  Ayumi Morita 0–1
  Magdaléna Rybáriková 0–1

Finals

Singles: 8 (6–2)

Head-to-head matchups

Team competitions: 1 (1–0)

Awards
 2011 ITF World Champion
 2011 WTA Most Improved Player

See also
2011 Serena Williams tennis season
2011 WTA Tour

Notes

References

External links
All of Petra Kvitova's 2011 results, Tennis Matchstat

Kvitova
Petra Kvitova tennis seasons
2011 in Czech tennis